Armageddon Riders is a vehicular combat video game produced by Targem Games. The game received praise for its graphics, but its gameplay was criticised as monotonous.

Plot
The protagonist survived a catastrophe caused by the Large Hadron Collider, which turned everyone in the city into bloodthirsty zombies. He returns to the abandoned city, looking for a way to change the zombies.

Gameplay
In Armageddon Riders, the player races a vehicle against a number of other computer controlled competitors in various settings, including city, harbour and Large Hadron Collider areas.

Development and release
Armageddon Riders was originally released on the PC on Steam, under the alternative title of Clutch, in 2009, but was eventually ported to the PlayStation 3 in 2011. The game was not available in Australia until after it was available in the rest of the world, while it awaited a classification from the Australian Classification Board.

Reception

Armageddon Riders received mixed reviews from critics, achieving a 62 rating on Metacritic out of 100. 

Marck Schoenmaker of PSFocus gave a positive review of the game, giving it 82/100 and praising its variation, declaring that it was "one of the nicer PSN games you can find". Matt Raspe of PlayStation Universe also gave a positive review, praising its visuals as "quite impressive", and declaring that it was a good example of its genre.

XGN gave a mixed review of the game, praising its graphics and declaring that killing zombies was satisfying, but also describing it as "monotonous". Ryan Green, writing in Total PlayStation, declared that it "doesn't offer anything intentionally challenging or cohesive", and that it "is a lot of things, but it doesn't do any of them well", though he praised the game's graphics. Kristen Reed, writing in Eurogamer, gave a negative review, declaring that it had an "uninspiring visual style and routine gameplay", and likened it to "shooting fish in a barrel".

References

External links
Official game site 

2011 video games
PlayStation 3 games
PlayStation 3-only games
PlayStation Network games
Racing video games
Vehicular combat games
Post-apocalyptic video games
Video games developed in Russia
Video games about zombies
Multiplayer and single-player video games
Targem Games games